Seo Hui (942 – 8 August 998) was a Korean politician and diplomat during the early days of the Goryeo Dynasty of Korea (918–1392). Seo is best remembered for his diplomatic skills that led 60,000 Khitan troops to withdraw from Goryeo without a battle.

Family
Seo Hui was of the Icheon Seo clan and was the son of Seo Pil (徐弼) who, during the King Gwangjong's reign, served as Naeuiryeong (內議令), the highest official post of Naeuiseong (內議省), the advisory council for the King. Until the time of his grandfather, Seo Sin-il (徐神逸), the Seo clan was a hojok (豪族) or a powerful local gentry based in what is now the Icheon areas, in the southeast of the Gyeonggi Province.

Like his father, Seo Hui became a jaesang (宰相), the collective term referring to officials with a high rank in ancient Korea. His sons, Seo Nul (徐訥) and Seo Yu-geol (徐惟傑) also followed their father's footstep by serving respectively as Munhasijung (門下侍中), the title of the highest minister of state, and Jwabokya (左僕射), the second rank of Sangseoseong (尙書省), Secretariat for State Affairs of Goryeo. As one of Seo Nul's daughters later became a queen by marrying King Hyeonjong, Seo Hui's clan was related to the King on the King's mother's side. With this background and his own talent, Seo Hui managed to establish a successful career.

Wives and issue(s):
Lady of the Cheongju Han clan (부인 청주 한씨)
Seo-Nul (?–1042) (서눌) – 1st son.
Seo Yu-geol (서유걸) – 2nd son.
Seo Yu-wi (서유위) – 4th son.
Unknown woman?
Seo Ju-haeng (서주행) – 3rd son.

Ancestry

Seo Hui had 1 older brother, Seo Yeom (서염, 徐廉) and 1 younger brother, Seo Yeong (서영, 徐英).

Career
After Seo Hui passed gwageo, the state examination, with a high grade, in March 960, the 11th year of King Gwangjong's reign, he served for the government as the Gwangpyeongwon eorang and Naeui sirang posts. In 983, Seo became Byeonggwan eosa, the official in charge of military affairs. Soon after that, he was appointed to important positions like Naesasirang pyeongsangsa, the second rank of Naesaseong (Supreme Council during the period), and finally he was raised to the highest position of Taebo Naesaryeong, the head of Supreme Council. In addition to his role in domestic politics, Seo engaged in diplomacy by going to China in 972 and playing an important role in re-establishing the diplomatic relationship between Goryeo and the Chinese Song Dynasty, which had been broken off over a decade earlier.

Negotiations with Liao
However, he is most remembered in his diplomatic career for his direct negotiations with General Xiao Sunning of the Liao Dynasty, which prevented a fullscale invasion by a host of Khitan troops:

According to the story, after Xiao captured Pongsan county in 993 and forced Goryeo's forces to retreat behind the Taedong River, he wrote to demand Goryeo's surrender: "[O]ur great country is about to unify land on all four directions" and to justify the expedition by charging: "your country does not take care of the people's needs, we solemnly execute heaven's punishment on its behalf". King Seongjong of Goryeo initially accepted Liao's demands, planning on the advice of his negotiators to give up the land north of Pyongyang to Xiao and drawing the Liao-Goryeo border in a straight line between Hwangju and P'aryŏng.

Seo Hui, however, was convinced that the Liao were acting from a position of "fear of us" and begged the king to "return to the capital and let us, your officers, wage one more battle". Seo rhetorically referred to the land that King Gwangjong had conquered from the Jurchens and which the Khitans (Liao) now held as "former Koguryŏ territory". After Xiao's forces were repulsed from further advances at the Battle of Anyung Fortress, Seo went to the Liao encampment to negotiate a settlement. Part of their conversation is excerpted:

Xiao: Your country arose in Silla territory. Koguryŏ territory is in our possession. But you have encroached on it. Your country is connected to us by land, and yet you cross the sea to serve China. Because of this, our great country came to attack you. If you relinquish land to us and establish a tributary relationship, everything will be all right.
<p>
Seo: That is not so. Our country is in fact former Koguryŏ, and that is why it is named Koryŏ and has a capital at P'yŏngyang. If you want to discuss territorial boundaries, the Eastern Capital of your country is within our borders.... Moreover, the land on both sides of the Yalu River is also within our borders, but the Jurchens have now stolen it.... If you tell us to drive out the Jurchens, recover our former territory, construct fortresses, and open the roads, then how could we dare not to have [tributary] relations?"

Seo reported to his king that he forged an agreement with Xiao to jointly "exterminate the Jurchens" and to seize their land so that Goryeo and Liao would have a closer land border and commensurate tributary relations. He lamented that the Jurchens would only allow Goryeo the land south of the Yalu River, but envisioned a future in which this situation of confinement would change.

This story in which Seo Hui supposedly stemmed a "Chinese" invasion of "Korean" territory by referencing a past regime's occupation of the disputed territory has become popular in South Korea in recent years with the advent of the Northeast Project, which claimed the ancient state of Goguryeo (Koguryŏ, 37 BCE–668 CE) was part of the Chinese empire. The South Korean online activist group VANK, for example, has posted a video in 2012 calling on "young Koreans" to become "the next generation of Seo Hui", by turning "this crisis of the loss of Korean history into another opportunity" for Korean territorial expansion, as it argues was the result of Seo's rhetoric.

Later life and death
Seo Hui died in 998, on the 14th day of the 7th lunar month (8 August 998).

In popular culture
Portrayed by Han Bum-hee in the 2002–2003 KBS TV series The Dawn of the Empire.
 Portrayed by Im Hyuk in the 2009 KBS2 TV series Empress Cheonchu.

See also
List of Goryeo people
Goryeo
Goryeo-Khitan Wars

References

Kang, Jae-eun; Lee, Suzanne. (2006) The land of scholars, Homa & Sekey Books, pp. 100–101, 
Kim, Chun-gil, (2005), The history of Korea, p. 57, Greenwood Publishing Group, 
Lee, Ki-baek; Wagner, Edward W. (1984) A new history of Korea, p. 125, Harvard University Press, 
Lee, Peter H.; William Theodore De Bary, (2000), Sources of Korean Tradition: From early times through the sixteenth century, Columbia University Press, pp. 171–174, 
Rossabi, Morris. (1983), China among equals, University of California Press, pp. 154–157,

External links
Seo Hui on Naver encyclopedia .

942 births
998 deaths
10th-century Korean people
Goryeo–Khitan War
Korean diplomats
Icheon Seo clan